Wakaw Lake is a resort village in the Canadian province of Saskatchewan within Census Division No. 15. It is on the shores of Wakaw Lake in the Rural Municipality of Hoodoo No. 401.

History 
Wakaw Lake incorporated as a resort village on October 21, 1959. The resort village takes its name from a nearby lake of the same name "Wakaw Lake", which is Cree meaning "crooked."

Demographics 

Government 
The Resort Village of Wakaw Lake is governed by an elected municipal council and an appointed administrator. The mayor is Maurice Rivard and its administrator is Pamela Hilkewich.

See also 
List of communities in Saskatchewan
List of municipalities in Saskatchewan
List of resort villages in Saskatchewan
List of villages in Saskatchewan
List of summer villages in Alberta

References

External links 

Resort villages in Saskatchewan
Hoodoo No. 401, Saskatchewan
Division No. 15, Saskatchewan